Vladimir Lebedev (Russian: Лебедев Владимир Николаевич; born April 23, 1984 on Tashkent) is a Russian freestyle skier who competed at the 2006 Winter Olympics in Turin, Italy. Lebedev won bronze in the men's aerials event.

References

Russian male freestyle skiers
1984 births
Living people
Freestyle skiers at the 2002 Winter Olympics
Freestyle skiers at the 2006 Winter Olympics
Olympic bronze medalists for Russia
Olympic freestyle skiers of Russia
Sportspeople from Tashkent
Olympic medalists in freestyle skiing
Medalists at the 2006 Winter Olympics
Universiade bronze medalists for Russia
Universiade medalists in freestyle skiing
Competitors at the 2009 Winter Universiade